Simon Upton (born 1 May 1969) is an Australian swimmer. He competed in two events at the 1988 Summer Olympics.

References

External links
 

1969 births
Living people
Australian male backstroke swimmers
Olympic swimmers of Australia
Swimmers at the 1988 Summer Olympics
Place of birth missing (living people)